Rarotonga International Airport   is the Cook Islands' main international gateway, located in the town and district of Avarua, Rarotonga,  west of the downtown area on the northern coast. Originally built in 1944, the airport was expanded in the early 1970s, and officially opened for jets in January 1974.

Because of the proximity of the runways to the nearby roads, it is possible to get very close to the aircraft while they are departing and landing. In July 2015, three tourists were injured by jet blast after being blown over while watching an Air New Zealand Boeing 777 take off. Consequently, in 2016, the Cook Islands Tourism Corporation warned tourist operators that they should not promote the jet blast area as a tourist attraction.

History
An unsealed airstrip at Nikao was originally constructed by the New Zealand Department of Public Works in 1944, with the first flight landing in November 1945. The New Zealand National Airways Corporation operated fortnightly flights to Fiji, Tonga, Samoa and Aitutaki from 1945 to 1952, and Polynesian Airways operated flights to Apia from 1963 to 1966. In 1964 the airstrip was extended from 5,000 to 6,000 feet, and TEAL proposed sealing the runway to allow for jet aircraft. The issue was forced in 1966, when increased regulation of international flights requiring the use of larger aircraft threatened to cut off air-travel entirely. Local land-owners agreed to expansion, and the New Zealand government agreed to provide funding in exchange for control of airspace rights. Construction began in June 1970, and completed in 1973. The first jet flight, an Air New Zealand Douglas DC-8, landed in December 1973. The international airport was officially opened on 28 January 1974.

The Cook Islands government took control of landing rights in 1985.
 
In 2003, the terminal and departure and check-in areas were revamped at a cost of US$650,000. An $8.5 million reconstruction project commenced in 2009 to revamp and expand the existing terminal facilities. The new-look terminal was officially opened on 22 June 2010.

Airlines and destinations

Gallery

References

External links 
 
 

Airports in the Cook Islands
Avarua
Airports established in 1974
1974 establishments in the Cook Islands